Donald Trenner (March 10, 1927 – May 16, 2020) was an American jazz pianist and arranger born in New Haven, Connecticut.

Career
He began his career playing with Ted Fio Rito from 1943 to 1945, and followed this with a slot in Buddy Morrow's orchestra in 1947. 
He worked with Charlie Barnet in 1951 and following this with Jerry Gray, Charlie Parker, Stan Getz, Georgie Auld, Jerry Fielding, Skinnay Ennis, Les Brown, Dick Haymes, Jack Jones, Lena Horne, Ann-Margret, Shirley MacLaine and Nancy Wilson. In 1957 he played with Oscar Pettiford and toured Europe in 1958 with Anita O'Day. He also toured with Bob Hope entertaining the U.S. troops. Additionally, he recorded with Tommy Dorsey, Vic Schoen, Howard McGhee, Frances Faye, Betty Roche, Nelson Riddle, Paul Broadnax, Charles Mingus, and Ben Webster.

In the 1960s, Trenner worked as a studio musician, and led The Steve Allen Show house band.
He continued working in television throughout the 1970s and 80s.

Personal life
On April 22,1947 in Elkton, Maryland, Trenner married singer Helen Carr, who sang with The Donn Trio. They were married until her death in 1960.
In 1966 Trenner married actress and singer B. J. Ward.  Although they divorced in 1978, they remained one of each other's closest and dearest friends until his death. In 1990, Trenner married Marycarmen Jones and though they divorced in 2005, they continued marking days as a family. They had a daughter, Sara Elizabeth Trenner.

Discography
With Dave Pell
Jazz & Romantic Places (Atlantic, 1955)
With Betty Roché
Take the "A" Train (Bethlehem, 1956)
With Ben Webster
The Warm Moods (Reprise, 1961)

References

[ Donn Trenner] at Allmusic

External links

Donn Trenner Interview NAMM Oral History Library (2004)

1927 births
2020 deaths
American jazz pianists
American male pianists
American jazz bandleaders
Musicians from New Haven, Connecticut
20th-century American pianists
Jazz musicians from Connecticut
21st-century American pianists
20th-century American male musicians
21st-century American male musicians
American male jazz musicians